The Kenya High Commission in London was established in 1963 to pursue Kenya's national interest in the United Kingdom. The diplomatic mission in London is also accredited to the International Maritime Organization, and the Commonwealth of Nations.

Kenya and the UK enjoy cordial relations, and the mission's mandate is to forge closer relations between the people of Kenya and the people of United Kingdom in pursuit of deeper bilateral and multilateral cooperation in trade and investments, culture, science and technology as well as other fields for mutual benefit.

The High Commission is housed in one of a group of Grade II* listed buildings in Portland Place.

Gallery

References

External links
 Official site
 Brief overview of embassy building

Kenya
Diplomatic missions of Kenya
Kenya–United Kingdom relations
Grade II* listed buildings in the City of Westminster
Marylebone